GU Piscium b (GU Psc b) is a directly imaged planetary-mass companion orbiting the star GU Piscium, with an extremely large orbit of , and an apparent angular separation of 42 arc seconds.

Properties
An orbital revolution around its parent star (which is 1/3 the mass of the Sun) or "year", would take approximately 163,000 years to complete, considering a circular orbit with 2000 AU as the semi-major axis. It is a gas giant located in the constellation of Pisces, 155 light-years from the Solar System, and estimated to have a mass nine to thirteen times that of Jupiter, and a surface temperature of 1000 K.

It is a relatively young stellar system, part of the AB Doradus moving group of ca. 30 main stars created from the same molecular cloud less than 100 million years ago, and the only one found among the 90 stars of the group examined.

Discovery
The discovery was made by an international team of astronomers led by Marie-Eve Naud of the Université de Montréal in Quebec, combining observations from telescopes of the Gemini Observatory, the Mont Mégantic Observatory (OMM), the Canada–France–Hawaii Telescope (CFHT) and the W. M. Keck Observatory. Its large distance away from its parent star permitted the use of combined infrared and visible light images to detect it, a technique astronomers hope to reproduce to discover much closer planets with the Gemini Planet Imager (GPI) in Chile.

Near-infrared spectroscopy of the companion was obtained with the GNIRS spectrograph on the Gemini North Telescope, which shows evidence of low surface gravity confirming the planet's youth. Weak methane absorption was detected in H and K band corresponding to a spectral type of T3.5.

See also
 List of exoplanet extremes
 List of directly imaged exoplanets
 CFBDSIR 2149−0403 - Possible rogue planet in the AB Doradus moving group
 WD 0806−661 Y-type sub-brown dwarf. It is currently the planetary-mass object with the widest known separation from its host star and it has the widest angular separation as seen from Earth (more than 2 arcminutes).

Notes

References

External links
 IOPscience: DISCOVERY OF A WIDE PLANETARY-MASS COMPANION TO THE YOUNG M3 STAR GU PSC
 arXiv: Discovery of a wide planetary-mass companion to the young M3 star GU Psc
 NASA ADS: Discovery of a Wide Planetary-mass Companion to the Young M3 Star GU Psc

Exoplanets detected by direct imaging
Exoplanets discovered in 2014
Pisces (constellation)